Al Greene may refer to:

 Al Greene (baseball) (1954–2014), baseball player
 Al Greene (footballer) (born 1978), Gibraltarian footballer

See also 
 Al Green (disambiguation)
 Albert Greene (disambiguation)